René (Pablo) Coucke (29 August 1938, in Ostend, Belgium – 19 June 2016, in Ostend) was a Flemish postimpressionistic painter and sculptor.  In a career spanning over 50 years, he has produced paintings and sculptures in bronze, tin, wood and steel.

Commissioned public works on view

De Klompenmaker – Sint-Niklaas, Belgium
Het Stilste Plekje – Eernegem, Belgium
The Millennium Door – Valletta harbour, Malta
De Dokwerker – Bruges, Belgium

References

1938 births
Belgian painters
Post-impressionist painters
Living people
20th-century Belgian sculptors